Gottlob Wilhelm Burmann (18 May 1737, in Lauban5 January 1805) was a German Romantic poet and lipogrammatist. He is best known for his dislike of the letter R. The letter does not appear in any of his 130 poems. He is even said to have eliminated it from his daily speech, refusing to say his last name for over seventeen years.

References

External links
 Lipograms

1737 births
1805 deaths
People from Lubań
People from the Electorate of Saxony
German poets
German male poets